Julia Cooley Altrocchi (July 4, 1893 - November 23, 1972) was an American author and poet, who wrote many works for children and adults, including The Poems of a Child, The Dance of Youth, Snow Covered Wagons, and Wolves Against the Moon.

Life 
She was born in 1893 in Seymour, Connecticut, to Harlan Cooley and Nellie Wooster Cooley, and then was raised in Chicago, Illinois. She graduated from the University of Chicago’s University High School, and from Vassar College in 1914. She married Rudolph Altrocchi in 1920. The couple moved to the San Francisco Bay Area in 1928 upon the latter's appointment as Professor and Chair of the Italian Department at the University of California, Berkeley; Julia resided in Berkeley until her death in 1972. The couple had two sons, John Cooley and Paul Hemenway. She is buried at Sunset View Cemetery in El Cerrito, California.

Altrocchi was a member of the California Writers Club.

Works 
The Poems of a Child: Being Poems Written Between the Ages of Six and Ten, 1904
The Dance of Youth: And Other Poems, 1917
The Forgotten Etruscans, 1927
Scenes at Canossa, 1935
Snow-Covered Wagons, 1936
Wolves Against the Moon, 1940
The Old California Trail: Traces in Folklore and Furrow, 1945
The Spectacular San Franciscans, 1949
Ships and Spears in Genoa, 1959
Girl with Ocelot: And Other Poems, 1964
The Golden Wheel: A Collection of Poetry, 2007 (edited by Paul Hemenwey Altrocchi)
Venom and Laughter: A Colleen Copes with Anti-Irish Prejudice, with Paul Hemenwey Altrocchi (co-authored and edited after death of Julia), 2012
 Fraught with Hazard, with Paul Hemenwey Altrocchi (co-authored and edited after death of Julia), 2015

References 

1883 births
1972 deaths
American women children's writers
American children's writers
American women novelists
American women poets